Endo-alpha-sialidase (endo-N-acylneuraminidase, endoneuraminidase, endo-N-acetylneuraminidase, poly(alpha-2,8-sialosyl) endo-N-acetylneuraminidase, poly(alpha-2,8-sialoside) alpha-2,8-sialosylhydrolase, endosialidase, endo-N) is an enzyme with systematic name polysialoside (2->8)-alpha-sialosylhydrolase. This enzyme catalyses the following chemical reaction:

 Endohydrolysis of (2->8)-alpha-sialosyl linkages in oligo- or poly(sialic) acids

References

External links 
 

EC 3.2.1